Sperata seenghala, the Giant river-catfish, is a species of bagrid catfish. It is known locally as Guizza, Guizza ayer, Auri, Ari, Pogal, Singhara and Seenghala, among other names.  It is found in southern Asia in the countries of Afghanistan, Pakistan, India, Nepal and Bangladesh with reports of occurrence in Myanmar, Thailand and Yunnan, China.  It can reach a length of 150 cm, though lengths up to 40 cm are more usual.  It is commercially fished for human consumption as well as being a popular gamefish with a reputation for being a good fighter when hooked.  It is carnivorous in diet. It can be distinguished from other sperata species by its spatulate, blunt snout, relatively short barbels and mouth that is only 1/3 as wide as the head is long.

References
 

Bagridae
Catfish of Asia
Fish of South Asia
Fish of Southeast Asia
Freshwater fish of Asia
Fish of Afghanistan
Fish of Pakistan
Freshwater fish of India
Fish of Bangladesh
Fish of Thailand
Freshwater fish of China
Fish of Nepal
Fish described in 1839
Taxa named by William Henry Sykes